Weigongcun may refer to:

Weigongcun, Beijing, area of Beijing, China
Weigongcun Station, on Beijing Subway, China